Audrey is a 2014 American comedy film directed by Dean Pollack and starring Sybil Temtchine, who wrote the screenplay with Pollack.

Plot

Cast
Sybil Temtchine as Audrey
Ed Quinn as Pete
Jonathan Chase as Gene
Ed Asner as Walt
Helena Mattsson as Tess
Robert Curtis Brown as Stan
Ethan Phillips as Donny
Charles Shaughnessy as Jacques

References

External links
 
 

American comedy films
2014 comedy films
2010s English-language films
2010s American films